Dussumieria is the genus of rainbow sardines, a group within the round herring family Dussumieriidae.

Species 
 Dussumieria acuta Valenciennes, 1847 (Rainbow sardine)
 Dussumieria elopsoides Bleeker, 1849 (Slender rainbow sardine)

References

 
Clupeiformes
Marine fish genera
Taxa named by Achille Valenciennes